New Mexico's 1st congressional district of the United States House of Representatives serves the central area of New Mexico, including most of Bernalillo County, all of Torrance County, and parts of Sandoval, Santa Fe and Valencia counties.  It includes almost three-fourths of Albuquerque. The district has a notable Native American presence, encompassing several pueblos including the Pueblo of Laguna and Sandia Pueblo, and the Tohajiilee Navajo Reservation outside Albuquerque. The seat is currently represented by Democrat Melanie Stansbury.

The district in recent years has, unlike other districts in the state, had a strong track record of its representatives ascending to higher office. Deb Haaland, Stansbury's predecessor, resigned in 2021 to become the United States Secretary of the Interior. Her predecessor, Michelle Lujan Grisham, took office as governor of New Mexico in 2019. Grisham's own predecessor, Martin Heinrich, was elected a U.S. Senator in 2012.

History

Until the 1968 elections, New Mexico's representatives were all elected at-large statewide.  Starting in 1969, however, they were elected by districts.

Historical district boundaries

Recent statewide election results
Results Under Current Lines (Since 2023)

Results Under Old Lines (2013-2023)

Results Under Old Lines (2003-2013)

List of members representing the district

Election results

1968

1970

1972

1974

1976

1978

1980

1982

1984

1986

1988

1990

1992

1994

1996

1998 (Special)

1998

2000

2002

2004

2006

2008

2010

2012

2014

2016

2018

2020

2021 (special)

2022

See also

New Mexico's congressional districts
List of United States congressional districts

Notes

References

 Congressional Biographical Directory of the United States 1774–present

01